Bruce Stanley Sheriff (April 24, 1932 – January 16, 1993) was an American football player, coach, and college athletics administrator.

Early life 
Sheriff graduated from Washington High School in San Francisco.

Playing career 
He played college football at California Polytechnic State University from 1950 to 1953. In 1953, not only did Sheriff earn Little All-America accolades, but also was picked as an honorable mention for the UPI's overall Division I-level All-American Team, for which he received 17 voting points.

Sheriff then played professionally in the National Football League (NFL) with the Pittsburgh Steelers, San Francisco 49ers, and Cleveland Browns between 1954 and 1957. He was the 49ers' primary starter at left linebacker in both 1956 and 1957.

Coaching career 
Sheriff served as the head football coach at the University of Northern Iowa from 1960 to 1982, compiling a record of 129–101–4. The football field inside the UNI-Dome, Northern Iowa's football stadium, is named Sheriff Field in his honor.

Athletic administration 
Sheriff was then the athletic director at the University of Hawaii at Manoa from 1983 until his death in 1993. He died on January 16, 1993, in Honolulu, Hawaii, after suffering a heart attack at Honolulu International Airport. 

The Stan Sheriff Center, the home venue for Hawaii's basketball and volleyball teams, was renamed in his honor in 1998. His alma mater, Cal Poly, regularly plays basketball and volleyball games annually in the arena bearing his name, as both schools are now members of the Big West Conference in those sports.

Head coaching record

References

External links
 

1932 births
1993 deaths
American football centers
American football linebackers
Cal Poly Mustangs football players
Cleveland Browns players
Hawaii Rainbow Warriors and Rainbow Wahine athletic directors
Northern Iowa Panthers athletic directors
Northern Iowa Panthers football coaches
Pittsburgh Steelers players
San Francisco 49ers players
Coaches of American football from California
Coaches of American football from Hawaii
Players of American football from San Francisco
Players of American football from Honolulu